Phenamidine is an antiprotozoal drug of the amidine class used in veterinary medicine.  It is used to treat Babesia infection (babesiosis) dogs, horses, and cattle.  Because the drug causes frequent allergic reactions, it is usually combined with an antihistamine.

References

Amidines
Antiprotozoal agents
Phenol ethers